The genus Catharus is an evolutionary clade of forest-dwelling passerine birds in the family Turdidae (thrushes), commonly known as nightingale-thrushes. The extant species are widely distributed across the Americas and are descended from a common ancestor that lived 4–6 million years ago. Most of the species are shy of humans, seldom leaving the cover of dense forest vegetation, where their activities are hidden from view. Thus, many fundamental aspects of their biology and life histories are poorly known.

Nightingale-thrushes are small omnivorous songbirds that, like their sister species the wood thrush (Hylocichla mustelina), exhibit a variety of migratory and non-migratory habits. Multiple species are long-distance migrants that breed in North America and "winter" in the Neotropics. The breeding range of one migratory species, the gray-cheeked thrush (C. minimus), extends into eastern Siberia. The remainder of the migratory species are restricted to the Americas, notwithstanding occasional vagrant records in Europe and northeast Asia. The non-migratory species are residents of the Neotropical realm.

Systematics
Historically, the migratory and residents were placed in two genera: Hylocichla and Catharus, respectively. However, molecular studies indicate that hermit thrush (C. guttatus) is more closely related to three Neotropical species (C. occidentalis, C. gracilirostris, C. frantzii) than to the long-distance migrants which it superficially resembles. This pattern of homoplasy may be the result of two independent origins of migration in the genus, and the convergent evolution of phenotypic characters associated with migration.

The taxonomy of Catharus dates to the 18th century and has a confusing history resulting from multiple cryptic species, taxonomic composites, misidentified species, and other historical errors. The name Catharus, authored by Charles Lucien Bonaparte, is derived from the Ancient Greek  meaning "pure" or "clean", and refers to the plumage of the orange-billed nightingale-thrush (C. aurantiirostris).

Species delimitation in Catharus remains an active topic of study and multiple taxonomic splits have been proposed and/or adopted during the last half century, to recognize long-overlooked cryptic species. For example, evidence supporting the split of C. frantzii and C. occidentalis was published in 1969; evidence supporting the split of C. bicknelli and C. minimus was published in 1993; most recently, evidence supporting the split of C. dryas and C. maculatus was published in 2017. The sister taxa C. ustulatus and C. swainsoni have also been treated at species rank by some authors.

The nightingale-thrushes, revered for their beautiful songs, have long been compared to the common nightingale (Luscinia megarhynchos). Theodore Roosevelt once remarked that, "In melody, and above all in that finer, higher melody where the chords vibrate with the touch of eternal sorrow, [L. megarhynchos] cannot rank with such singers as the Wood Thrush and Hermit Thrush. The serene, ethereal beauty of the Hermit's song, rising and falling through the still evening under the archways of hoary mountain forests that have endured from time everlasting". A study published in 2014 presented evidence that hermit thrush songs, like human music, tend to be constructed of frequency ratios that are expressed as simple mathematical ratios and follow the harmonic series.

Species

References

 
Bird genera

Taxa named by Charles Lucien Bonaparte